This article gives an overview of various catalogues of classical compositions that have come into general use.

Opus numbers
While the opus numbering system has long been the standard manner in which individual compositions are identified and referenced, it is far from universal, and there have been many different applications of the system. Very few composers gave opus numbers to all of their published works without exception:
 Some composers used it for certain genres of music but not for others (for example, in Handel's time, it was normal to apply opus numbers to instrumental compositions but not to vocal compositions such as operas, oratorios, etc.).
 Some composers gave opus numbers to some of their early compositions but abandoned the practice after some time (examples include Liszt and Hindemith).
 Some used it in a very erratic manner or were subject to the wishes of their publishers, who for commercial reasons often presented works with opus numbers that bore little relationship to their place in the chronological sequence of the composer's works. In cases such as Schubert and Dvořák, one opus number could refer to a number of different works; or a single work could appear under different opus numbers.
 Some composers abandoned their early compositions and restarted the opus numbering sequence. Some did this more than once. For example, Bartók three times started numbering his works with opus numbers. He stopped the system in 1921 because of the difficulty of distinguishing between original works and ethnographic arrangements, and between major and minor works.

There are cases where works that a composer chose not to publish were published after their death and assigned very late opus numbers that often give a misleading idea of their order of composition (cases include Mendelssohn, Chopin and Tchaikovsky).

Other composers simply never used opus numbers at all (examples include Copland, Vaughan Williams and many other 20th-century composers).

In some cases, the opus numbers that were established during the composer's lifetime are still used, but symbols from alternative comprehensive catalogues are used for unpublished works or works that have come to light since the composer's death.

Comprehensive catalogues
For the above and other reasons, musicologists have often found it necessary to produce comprehensive catalogues that incorporate the most up-to-date information available about the composers' works. These catalogues sometimes also include unpublished sketches, incomplete drafts, even doubtful works and those known to have been spuriously attributed, as well as writings and other non-musical output.

When such a catalogue finds general acceptance, the sequence numbers allocated by the author then become the standard way of referencing the composer's works, and these numbers usually supersede the opus numbers (if any) that were previously used.

Some such catalogues are organised in a single chronological sequence; others are divided into different genres and listed chronologically within each genre; others are alphabetically arranged. Thematic catalogue indicates a catalogue with a music example (incipit/theme) for each entry, usually represented on one or two staves. A symbol is chosen to represent the catalogue as a whole, and this is usually the initial of the author's or the composer's surname, or an abbreviation of the title of the catalogue itself. In a small number of cases, different symbols apply to different parts of the catalogue.

Among the most famous examples of this are:
 the BWV numbers allocated to Johann Sebastian Bach's works in the Bach-Werke-Verzeichnis (Bach Works List) developed by Wolfgang Schmieder. They are also sometimes referred to by their S numbers (after Schmieder)
 the K numbers allocated to Wolfgang Amadeus Mozart's works in the Köchel catalogue, created by Ludwig Ritter von Köchel. In Germany and other parts of Europe, the symbol used is KV, for Köchel-Verzeichnis (Köchel List)
 the  numbers allocated to Franz Schubert's works in the Deutsch catalogue, developed by Otto Erich Deutsch

In some cases, both the opus number and the newer catalogue designation are sometimes appended to a work.

Some catalogues have appendices (abbreviated as Anh.) for doubtful and/or spurious works, arrangements, etc.

Thematic catalogue
A thematic catalogue is an index used to identify musical compositions through the citation of the opening notes (incipit) and/or main theme(s) of the work and/or of its movements or main sections. Such catalogues can be used for many purposes, including as guides to a specific composer's works, as an inventory of a library's holding or as an advertisement of a publisher's output. In addition to the musical identification, a thematic catalogue may contain information such as dates of composition and first performance. Works within a thematic catalogue can be grouped chronologically or by genre.

Thematic catalogues produced as scholarly guides to the works of a particular composer provide a shorthand means of identification for their music. The Bach-Werke-Verzeichnis (BWV) numbering system used for the works of Johann Sebastian Bach is one example.

Multiple catalogues
In a number of cases, more than one catalogue exists, or has existed, for the same composer's works. In most such cases, only one will be considered the current standard catalogue for the purposes of musicological indexing. For example, Liszt's works are now known only by S numbers, from the catalogue by Humphrey Searle, which superseded that created by Peter Raabe, which used R numbers.  Older catalogues are included for historiographic purposes.

But there are exceptions to this, such as:
 For Domenico Scarlatti, the Longo catalogue (L numbers) was in use from 1906, and although it has become generally superseded by the 1953 Kirkpatrick catalogue (K or Kk numbers), L numbers are still seen in references. In 1967, Pestelli created a third catalogue (P numbers), which has found acceptance in some places. Because all three symbols are often encountered, there is a concordance to help navigate between them.
Beethoven's works can appear with an opus number, a WoO number, a Hess number or a Bia number (see Catalogues of Beethoven compositions). Until 1955, the opus numbers that appeared in the Beethoven Gesamtausgabe were used exclusively, but this edition omitted a large number of works. In 1955, Georg Kinsky and Hans Helm produced a listing of works that had not been given opus numbers, and gave them WoO numbers (Werke ohne Opuszahl, or "Works without opus number"). This listing is often referred to as the Kinsky Catalogue. In 1957, Willy Hess produced a new catalogue of Beethoven's unpublished works, which included all or most of the Kinsky Catalogue as well as other pieces; Hess numbers were allocated to this sequence of works. In 1968, Giovanni Biamonti produced the Biamonti Catalogue, which sought to combine and update all pre-existing catalogues. Bia numbers relate to this catalogue.
 Note: The WoO symbol has also been used to classify some other composers' works that were not given opus numbers, such as certain works by Mendelssohn, Schumann and Brahms.
 In Chopin's case, at least three latter-day catalogues vie for prominence: Maurice J. E. Brown (B numbers); Krystyna Kobylańska (KK numbers); and Józef Michał Chomiński, whose catalogue is segmented into six parts, each part utilising a different letter (A, C, D, E, P and S). Hence, a work of Chopin can be referred to by its opus number and/or a catalogue number preceded by one of eight letter symbols.
 The cataloguing of Bartók's works is similarly complex. Bartók assigned opus numbers to his works three times. He ended this practice with the Violin Sonata No. 1, Op. 21 in 1921, because of the difficulty of distinguishing between original works and ethnographic arrangements, and between major and minor works. Since his death, three attempts—two full and one partial—have been made at cataloguing. The first, and still most widely used, is András Szőllősy's chronological Sz numbers, from 1 to 121. Denijs Dille subsequently reorganised the juvenilia (Sz. 1–25) thematically, as DD numbers 1 to 77. The most recent catalogue is that of László Somfai; this is a chronological index with works identified by BB numbers 1 to 129, incorporating corrections based on the Béla Bartók Thematic Catalogue.

List of catalogues

The following incomplete list gives details of many of the catalogues and symbols that have been used, and in many cases are still in use. It is in author or composer order, but can be sorted in symbol order.

References

Further reading
 Barry S. Brook, Richard J. Viano. Thematic Catalogues in Music: An Annotated Bibliography – Second Edition. Pendragon Press, 1997.

External links
 Guide des difficultés de rédaction en musique (GDRM): Catalogues thématiques (list of thematic catalogues grouped by categories, such as symbols common to several composers and ending with the letters "V" [Verzeichnis] or "WV" [Werkverzeichnis])

 
Musical terminology
Identifiers